At the 1900 Summer Olympics, twenty-three athletics events were contested. Altogether, 117 athletes from 15 nations competed. A total of 68 medals (23 gold, 23 silver, 22 bronze) were awarded. In many countries, due in part to the conflation of the Olympic Games and the World's Fair in Paris, the media discussed only the athletics events under the "Olympic" name while ignoring the incredible variety of other sports featured at the time.

The 23 events listed are those currently considered to have been of Olympic stature by the International Olympic Committee and most Olympic historians.  They exclude all events that used a handicap system, as well as all events which were open to professional athletes. The IOC has never decided which events were "Olympic" and which were not.

Competitions were held on 14 July, 15 July, 16 July, 19 July, and 22 July.  This included Bastille Day, which is a French holiday, and then Sunday, which many of the American athletes protested.  Even with many Americans not competing in finals because of confusion caused by the organizers' decision to count scores achieved on Monday, 16 July for finals held on Sunday, 15 July and subsequent rescission of that decision, the United States won more than 4 times as many medals as any other nation, including 16 of the 23 gold medals.

The conditions of competition were also subpar compared even to those at the previous games in 1896.  There was no track for the Paris Games, as a grass field dotted with trees and of unequal elevation was used.  The course was 500 metres in length, an unusual distance for a track.

Medal summary

These medals are retroactively assigned by the International Olympic Committee; at the time, winners were given silver medals.

Daily summary

14 July
 All rounds, including the finals, for the 100 metres and the 110 metre hurdles were held.  The United States took 5 of the medals, missing only the bronze medal in the 100 metres won by Stan Rowley of Australia. Frank Jarvis won the 100 metres, with Alvin Kraenzlein taking the gold in the 110 metre hurdles.
 In the 400 metre heats, the United States took 5 qualifying spots for the final while Denmark secured the last one.  The 800 metres was more balanced, with 3 Americans and one athlete each from France, Great Britain, and Hungary.
 The 400 metre hurdles semifinals eliminated only one athlete, with the other four advancing to the finals.
 Defending discus and shot put champion Robert Garrett failed to make a mark in the qualification round of the discus throw, but did advance to the final in the shot put.  Bohemia advanced a thrower in the discus, an event which saw 5 athletes from 5 different nations qualify.
 Surprising few, Kraenzlein and Meyer Prinstein took the top two spots in the long jump qualification, moving to the final along with a third American, a Briton, and a Frenchman.

15 July
 In a busy day for the athletics program, 10 finals were held along with the semifinals of the 60 metres (which was one of the events with a final that day).  The United States took 7 of the championships, with Great Britain, Canada, and Hungary each picking up one.
 Kraenzlein took the top spots in the 60 metres and the long jump, the latter victory allegedly earning him a punch in the face from Prinstein, who had not competed because the final was held on a Sunday.  This brought Kraenzlein's total to 3 gold medals, better than any athlete had done four years earlier.  Irving Baxter also took gold in two events, the high jump and the pole vault.
 Denmark won its first athletics medal, with a bronze in the 400 metres.  Charles Bennett's gold in the 1500 metres gave Britain its first gold in the sport.  Canada's George Orton took two medals, a gold and a bronze, for the debut nation.  Hungary won its first gold with the discus throw, adding a bronze in the high jump.  Bohemia, another nation making its debut, took the silver medal in the discus.
 The steeplechase made its Olympic debut, with the 2500 metre version won by Orton.

16 July
 Eight more finals were held on Monday the 16th.  Kraenzlein picked up a fourth victory with the 200 metre hurdles, winning both his semifinal and the final to set a long-lived Olympic record for athletic gold medals in individual events.  Ray Ewry won all three of the standing jumps, each of which made its Olympic debut in 1900.  Great Britain picked up another pair of gold medals with the 800 metres and the 4000 metre steeplechase.  Prinstein got his long-awaited victory in the triple jump, while John Flanagan's hammer throw earned the United States its 6th championship of the day.
 India's debut Games reached a high point with Norman Pritchard's silver medal in the 200 metre hurdles.

19 July
 The marathon was the only event held on the 19th.  Michel Théato of Luxembourg won the gold medal, giving that nation a perfect 1:1 ratio of championships to entries.  Sweden earned its first athletics medal with the bronze in the marathon.

22 July
 The two remaining events were held on Sunday the 22nd.  The semifinals of the 200 metres and the finals of that event and the 5000 metre team race were held.
 Pritchard won his second silver medal in the 200 metres, while Rowley won his third bronze in the same event.  The race was won by Walter Tewksbury, bringing his total for the Games to 5 medals, including 2 gold medals.
 The 5000 metre team race was won by the British team, assisted by Rowley of Australia. This makes Rowley the only athlete in Olympic history to win gold medals for multiple nations in the same Games; the establishment of National Olympic Committees ensures this accomplishment will remain unique. Also of note is that Rowley did not finish the race: it was far longer than the sprinter was accustomed to running, and after having been injured and reduced to walking, he retired after everyone else had crossed the finish line to accept last place.

Participating nations

Notes

References
 International Olympic Committee.
 De Wael, Herman. Herman's Full Olympians: "Athletics 1900". Accessed 18 March 2006.
 

 
1900 Summer Olympics events
1900
International athletics competitions hosted by France
Athletics in Paris